Germanotta is an Italian surname. 

People with this surname include:
 Cynthia Germanotta (born 1954), American philanthropist
 Lady Gaga (born Stefani Germanotta; 1986), American singer and actress; daughter of Cynthia
 Natali Germanotta (born 1992), American fashion designer and stylist; daughter of Cynthia

Italian-language surnames